Osas Marvellous Ikpefua (born 23 October 1986), better known as Osas Saha, is a professional footballer who plays as a forward for Liga 1 club Persita Tangerang. Born in Nigeria, he represented Indonesia at international level.

With his partner, Osas just launched his new venture, Global Sportainment Network, on 12 March 2022 in front of the South Jakarta Mayor in Indonesia and Foreign Ambassadors from Japan, Italy, Spain, Seychelles, Algeria, The United States and France. Although he has started his Sport business, he is still willing to continue his career as a professional footballer.

Club career

Persija Jakarta
He was signed for Persija Jakarta to play in Liga 1 in 2018 season. Osas made his debut on 6 July 2018 in a match against PSM Makassar. On 6 July 2018, Osas scored his first goal in the 52nd minute at the Sultan Agung Stadium, Bantul.

TIRA-Persikabo
In 2019, Osas signed a year contract with TIRA-Persikabo. He made his league debut on 18 May 2019 in a match against Badak Lampung. On 29 June 2019, Osas scored his first goal for TIRA-Persikabo against Arema in the 26th minute at the Gajayana Stadium, Malang.

PSM Makassar
He was signed for PSM Makassar to play in Liga 1 in the 2020 season. Osas made his league debut on 1 March 2020 in a match against PSS Sleman. This season was suspended on 27 March 2020 due to the COVID-19 pandemic. The season was abandoned and was declared void on 20 January 2021.

Bhayangkara Solo
In 2021, Osas signed a contract with Indonesian Liga 1 club Bhayangkara Solo.

PSG Pati
In 2021, Osas signed a contract with Indonesian Liga 2 club PSG Pati. He made his league debut on 11 October against Persijap Jepara. On 25 October 2021, Osas scored his first goal for PSG Pati against Hizbul Wathan in the 61st minute at the Manahan Stadium, Surakarta.

Persita Tengerang
Osas was signed for Persita Tangerang to play in Liga 1 in the 2022–23 season. He made his league debut on 7 August 2022 in a match against Dewa United at the Indomilk Arena, Tangerang.

International career
He made his debut for the Indonesia in the 2022 FIFA World Cup qualification against Thailand on 10 September 2019.

Career statistics

Club

International appearances

Honours

Persija Jakarta
 Liga 1: 2018

References

External links 
 
 

1986 births
Living people
Sportspeople from Warri
Indonesian footballers
Indonesia international footballers
Nigerian footballers
Nigerian emigrants to Indonesia
Indonesian people of Nigerian descent
PSDS Deli Serdang players
KF Elbasani players
PSAP Sigli players
PSMS Medan players
Persepam Madura Utama players
Persisam Putra Samarinda players
Persiram Raja Ampat players
Semen Padang F.C. players
Perseru Serui players
Penang F.C. players
Persija Jakarta players
PS TIRA players
Persikabo 1973 players
PSM Makassar players
Bhayangkara F.C. players
PSG Pati players
Persita Tangerang players
Expatriate soccer players in Canada
Expatriate footballers in Albania
Expatriate footballers in Indonesia
Expatriate footballers in Malaysia
Liga 1 (Indonesia) players
Liga 2 (Indonesia) players
Kategoria Superiore players
Malaysia Super League players
Association football forwards
Nigerian expatriate footballers
Nigerian expatriate sportspeople in Albania
Nigerian expatriate sportspeople in Canada
Nigerian expatriate sportspeople in Indonesia
Nigerian expatriate sportspeople in Malaysia
Canadian Soccer League (1998–present) players
Naturalised citizens of Indonesia